Patriarchate of Kyiv may refer to:
 Ukrainian Orthodox Church – Kyiv Patriarchate, former Eastern Orthodox church body in Ukraine, until 2018
 Ukrainian Autocephalous Orthodox Church , former Eastern Orthodox church body, until 2018
 Patriarchate of the Ukrainian Autocephalous Orthodox Church - Canonical, a distinctive church body in Ukraine

See also 
 Patriarch (disambiguation)
 Patriarch of Kyiv (disambiguation)
 Archeparchy of Kyiv (disambiguation)
 Bishop of Kyiv (disambiguation)
 Eparchy of Kyiv (disambiguation)
 List of Metropolitans and Patriarchs of Kyiv (enumerating many title variations)